The  is a subway line, which forms part of the Fukuoka City Subway system in the city of Fukuoka, Japan. It connects Nakasu-Kawabata in Hakata Ward with Kaizuka in Higashi Ward, all within Fukuoka. The line's color on maps is blue. Officially, the line is called . Like other Fukuoka City Subway lines, stations are equipped with automatic platform gates, and trains are automatically operated by ATO system.

Service outline
The line has a through service with the Fukuoka City Subway Kūkō Line. Half of its trains go through the Kūkō Line, while the remainder terminate within the Hakozaki Line. Unlike the Kūkō Line, there is no through service with the JR Chikuhi Line.

Stations

Rolling stock

Fukuoka City Subway
 1000 series (since 1982)
 2000 series (since 1992)

JR Kyushu
 103-1500 series (since 1982)
 303 series (since 2000)
 305 series (since 2015)

History
The line opened on 20 April 1982, initially named "Line 2", operating between Nakasu-Kawabata and Gofukumachi. The entire line to Kaizuka was opened on 12 November 1986.

See also
List of railway lines in Japan

References

External links 
  
  

 
Fukuoka City Subway
Railway lines opened in 1982
1067 mm gauge railways in Japan
1982 establishments in Japan